was a Japanese daimyō of the late Sengoku period through early Edo period, who served the Tokugawa clan. As one of the Tokugawa family's foremost military commanders, he was considered one of its "Four Guardian Kings" (shitennō 四天王) along with Sakai Tadatsugu, Honda Tadakatsu and Ii Naomasa. His court title was Shikibu-Shō (式部大輔).

Early life

Sakakibara Yasumasa was born in the year Tenmon-17 (1548), the second son of Sakakibara Nagamasa, in the Ueno district of Mikawa Province. The Sakakibara were hereditary retainers of the Matsudaira (later Tokugawa) clan, classified as fudai. However, they did not serve the clan directly, but instead served one of its senior retainers, which at that time was Sakai Tadanao (which classified the Sakakibara as baishin, or "rear vassals"). 

The young Yasumasa interacted with Matsudaira Motoyasu (later Tokugawa Ieyasu) often from a young age, and was soon appointed his page. Due to his valor at Battle of Batogahara 1564 in the suppression of the Ikkō-ikki uprising in Mikawa, he was allowed to use the "yasu" from Motoyasu's name.

At this time, he unseated his brother and became head of the Sakakibara clan. There are two explanations for this. One is that his brother had been an ally of the Ikko Ikki rebels, and the other is that his brother was a retainer of Ieyasu's son Matsudaira Nobuyasu, who was implicated in what was most probably a non-existent treason plot against Oda Nobunaga.

Service under Ieyasu

In Eiroku-9 (1566), at age 19, Yasumasa had his coming-of-age ritual, and soon after, he and Honda Tadakatsu were made hatamoto by Ieyasu, and each granted command of 50 cavalrymen. From that point on, they would function as Ieyasu's hatamoto unit commanders.

In 1570, Yasumasa battled at Anegawa, He was on second division along with Honda Tadakatsu onto Asakura's left flank, surrounding Asakura Kagetake.  Later, He battled at Mikatagahara in 1573, along with the Nagashino in 1575. 

In 1584, when Ieyasu chose to defy Toyotomi Hideyoshi, Yasumasa still served under Ieyasu, suggesting the region of Komaki would be suitable for the ensuing campaign. Yasumasa was given the title of "'Shikibu-Shō'", when accompanying Ieyasu to Osaka to meet with Hideyoshi. 

In 1590, after the Tokugawa moved to the Kantō region, he was to have a  team responsible for the allocation of fiefs. While Ieyasu was serving as one of Hideyoshi's staff in Kyūshū, Yasumasa was to supervise Kantō, as one of the chief administrators.

Yasumasa received the 100,000 koku fief of Tatebayashi han following the Tokugawa victory at the Battle of Sekigahara in 1600, which remained in the family for a few generations.

Death

Yasumasa himself died in 1606, at the age of 59, and is buried at Zendoji Temple in Tatebayashi, where his grave still stands. His son Sakakibara Yasukatsu fought at the Osaka Campaign.

See also
 Sakai Tadatsugu
 Ii Naomasa
 Honda Tadakatsu

Notes

References
 Nussbaum, Louis Frédéric and Käthe Roth. (2005). Japan Encyclopedia. Cambridge: Harvard University Press. ; OCLC 48943301

Further reading
 Bolitho, Harold. (1974). Treasures Among Men: The Fudai Daimyo in Tokugawa Japan. New Haven: Yale University Press.  ;  OCLC 185685588

1548 births
1606 deaths
People from Shizuoka Prefecture
Sakakibara clan
Fudai daimyo